Single Carrot Theatre is an ensemble theatre company in Baltimore, Maryland, in the United States. The Company was founded in 2005 by students from the University of Colorado at Boulder. The company selected Baltimore, MD as the city to locate their theatre after a nationwide city search.

Its mission statement emphasizes "new, diverse and socially significant works" and the company's support for "the growth of young artists."

Production history

Season 1: 2007/2008
Red Light Winter by Adam Rapp, Directed by J. Buck Jabaily; August 8 – 19, 2007

The Baltimore Waltz by Paula Vogel, Directed by Genevieve de Mahy; October 17 – November 4

La Muñeca by Aldo Pantoja, Directed by Brendan Ragan; December 13–22

Sects and Violins by Single Carrot Theatre, Directed by Jessica Garett; March 13–29

Richard III (play) by William Shakespeare, Directed by  J. Buck Jabaily; July 17 - August 3

Other Projects for Season 1 2007/2008
First Annual Murder Ink reading by Anna Ditkoff, Directed by J. Buck Jabaily

Artscape ’07 Performance: Legalize Gay Marriage – A 24 Hour Play by Single Carrot Theatre, Directed by Genevieve de Mahy; July 21, 2007

Season 2: 2008/2009

Food For Fish by Adam Szymkowicz, Directed by Genevieve de Mahy; October 9 – 26

Crave by Sarah Kane, Directed by J. Buck Jabaily; December 4 – 21

Killer Joe by Tracy Letts, Directed by Giti Jabaily; February 19 – March 15

The Wild Duck by Henrik Ibsen, Directed by J. Buck Jabaily; April 20 - May 24

Slampooned! by Single Carrot Theatre, Directed by Aldo Pantoja; July 9 - August 2

Other Projects for Season 2 2008/2009

Second Annual Murder Ink reading by Anna Ditkoff, Directed by Jessica Garrett

Season 3: 2009/2010

Eurydice by Sarah Ruhl, Directed by J. Buck Jabaily; September 23 – October 18
 
Illuminoctem by Single Carrot Theatre, Directed by Brendan Ragan; November 25 - December 20

Playing Dead by The Presynakov Brothers, Directed by Yury Urnov; February 17 – March 14

Crumble (Lay Me Down, Justin Timeberlake) by Sheila Callaghan, Directed by Aldo Pantoja; April 28 – May 23

Tragedy: a tragedy by Will Eno, Directed by J. Buck Jabaily; June 16 – July 11

Other Projects for Season 3 2009/2010
Poe Project by Genevieve de Mahy, Directed by Nathan Cooper; October 29 – November 1

Third Annual Murder Ink reading by Anna Ditkoff, Directed by J. Buck Jabaily

BMA Gallery Project: If This Art Could Talk by Jessica Garrett, Directed by Jessica Garrett

Season 4: 2010/2011
Natural Selection by Eric Coble, Directed by Nathan Fulton; September 29 – October 31
 
The Other Shore by Gao Xingjian, Directed by J. Buck Jabaily; December 8 – January 16
 
The Long Christmas Ride Home by Paula Vogel, Directed by Jessica Garrett; March 16 – April 17
 
Linus & Alora by Andrew Irons, Directed by Genevieve de Mahy; June 8 – July 10

Other Projects for Season 4 2010/2011

BMA Performance: Three Andys by Rich Espey, Directed by Genevieve de Mahy
 
Fourth Annual Murder Ink reading by Anna Ditkoff, Directed by J. Buck Jabaily
 
Rumpled by The Single Carrot Theatre Assembly Program, Directed by J. Buck Jabaily

Season 5: 2011/2012

Church by Young Jean Lee, Directed by Nathan Fulton; September 28 – October 30, 2011
 
MilkMilkLemonade by Joshua Conkel, Directed by Nathan Cooper; January 4 – February 5, 2012
 
Hotel Cassiopeia by Charles Mee, Directed by Genevieve de Mahy; March 28 – April 29, 2012
 
Foot of Water by Single Carrot Theatre, Directed by Ben Hoover; June 6 – July 8, 2012

Season 6: 2012/2013

Drunk Enough To Say I Love You? by Caryl Churchill, Directed by Ben Hoover;

"Tropic of X" by Caridad Svich, Directed by Nathan Cooper

"The V.I.P." by Aldo Pantoja, Directed by Aldo Pantoja

"A Sorcerer's Journey" by Alix Fenhagen, Directed by Nathan Fulton

Season 7: 2013/2014

"A Beginner's Guide To Deicide" by Qui Nguyen and Robert Ross, Directed by Elliott Rauh

"Worst Case Scenario" by Jessica Garrett (Head Writer), Directed by Jessica Garrett

"The Flu Season" by Will Eno, Directed by Alix Fenhagen

"The Memo" by Václav Havel, Directed by Stephen Nunns

"The Apocalypse Comes at 6pm" by Georgi Gospodinov, Directed by Genevieve de Mahy

Season 8: 2014/2015

"Social Creatures" by Jackie Sibblies Drury, Directed by Kellie Mecleary

"References To Salvador Dali Make Me Hot" by José Rivera, Directed by Steve Satta

"Utopia Parkway" by Charles Mee, Directed by Genevieve de Mahy

"Blind From Here" by Alix Fenhagen, Directed by Stephen Nunns

References

ññ

Theatre companies in Maryland